Samuel Dunn is a professional rugby league footballer who played as a centre for the Dewsbury Rams in the Kingstone Press Championship.

References

External links
Dewsbury Rams profile

Living people
Rugby league centres
Dewsbury Rams players
Year of birth missing (living people)